Dedalus is an Italian jazz-rock group formed in the early 1970s by Fiorenzo Michele Bonansone (keyboards, cello, vocals), Marco di Castri (guitar, sax), Furio di Castri (bass) and Enrico Grosso (drums). Their eponymous first album Dedalus was released in 1973. A year after Furio left the group in 1974, a second,  more experimental album, Materiale per tre esecutori e nastro magnetico was released. A third album was recorded but has never been released.

By the end of the 1970s, Dedalus effectively ceased to exist, until being revived in the early 1990s by Bonansone, di Castri and Grosso. In 1997, (the year after Grosso left the band) they released Pia Visione, recorded at Dedalus Studio in Turin.

In 2017, a four CD set with a 60 pages book (Le Ricordanze) was published with all Dedalus recordings from 1973 to present.

References

External links
 biography at ItalianProg
 biography at Mutant Sounds

Italian rock music groups
Italian jazz ensembles
Italian jazz musicians
Italian progressive rock groups